The 2017 World Mixed Doubles Curling Championship was held from April 22 to 29 at the Lethbridge Curling Club in Lethbridge, Canada. The event was held in conjunction with the 2017 World Senior Curling Championships.

Teams

Round-robin standings
Final round-robin standings

Round-robin results
All draw times are listed in MDT (UTC-6).

Group A

Saturday, April 22
Draw 1 8:00

Sunday, April 23
Draw 7 14:30

Draw 9 21:00

Monday, April 24
Draw 10 8:00

Draw 11 11:15

Draw 13 17:45

Tuesday, April 25
Draw 15 8:00

Draw 17 14:30

Draw 18 17:45

Wednesday, April 26
Draw 21 11:15

Draw 22 14:30

Draw 24 21:00

Thursday, April 27
Draw 25 8:00

Group B

Saturday, April 22
Draw 3 15:00

Draw 4 8:00

Sunday, April 23
Draw 5 8:00

Monday, April 24
Draw 11 11:15

Draw 12 14:30

Draw 14 21:00

Tuesday, April 25
Draw 16 11:15

Draw 18 17:45

Draw 19 21:00

Wednesday, April 26
Draw 20 8:00

Draw 22 14:30

Draw 23 17:45

Draw 24 21:00

Thursday, April 27
Draw 26 11:15

Draw 27 14:30

 forfeited their match against

Group C

Saturday, April 22
Draw 3 15:00

Draw 4 20:00

Sunday, April 23
Draw 6 11:15

Draw 8 17:45

Draw 9 21:00

Monday, April 24
Draw 12 14:30

Draw 13 17:45

Draw 14 21:00

Tuesday, April 25
Draw 16 11:15

Draw 17 14:30

Wednesday, April 26
Draw 20 8:00

Draw 21 11:15

Draw 22 14:30

Thursday, April 27
Draw 25 8:00

Draw 26 11:15

Group D

Saturday, April 22
Draw 1 8:00

Draw 2 11:15

Draw 3 15:00

Sunday, April 23
Draw 5 8:00

Draw 8 17:45

Monday, April 24
Draw 10 8:00

Draw 12 14:30

Draw 13 17:45

Tuesday, April 25
Draw 19 21:00

Wednesday, April 26
Draw 21 11:15

Draw 22 14:30

Draw 24 21:00

Thursday, April 27
Draw 25 8:00

Draw 27 14:30

Group E

Saturday, April 22
Draw 2 11:15

Draw 4 20:00

Sunday, April 23
Draw 6 11:15

Draw 7 14:30

Draw 9 21:00

Monday, April 24
Draw 11 11:15

Tuesday, April 25
Draw 15 8:00

Draw 17 14:30

Wednesday, April 26
Draw 20 8:00

Draw 23 17:45

Thursday, April 27
Draw 26 11:15

Draw 27 14:30

Playoffs

Round of 16
Friday, April 28, 9:00

Friday, April 28, 12:30

9th–16th Quarterfinals
Friday, April 28, 16:00

Quarterfinals
Friday, April 28, 19:30

9th–12th Semifinals
Saturday, April 29, 8:30

11 v 12
Saturday, April 29, 12:00

5th–8th Semifinals
Saturday, April 29, 12:00

Semifinals
Saturday, April 29, 12:00

9 v 10
Saturday, April 29, 16:00

7 v 8
Saturday, April 29, 16:00

5 v 6
Saturday, April 29, 16:00

Bronze medal game
Saturday, April 29, 16:00

Gold medal game
Saturday, April 29, 16:00

Top 5 Player percentages
Round robin only

References

External links

World Mixed Doubles Curling Championship
2017 in Canadian curling
Qualification tournaments for the 2018 Winter Olympics
International curling competitions hosted by Canada
Sport in Lethbridge
April 2017 sports events in Canada
Curling in Alberta
2017 in Alberta